Loricariichthys anus is a species of catfish in the family Loricariidae. It is native to South America, where it occurs in coastal rivers of southern Brazil, as well as the drainage basins of the Uruguay River and the lower Paraná River in Argentina and Uruguay. The species reaches 46 cm (18.1 inches) in length and is believed to be a facultative air-breather.

References 

Loricariidae
Fish described in 1835
Taxobox binomials not recognized by IUCN